The Augusta metropolitan area is a metropolitan area in the U.S. states of Georgia and South Carolina centered on the principal city of Augusta. The U.S. Office of Management and Budget, Census Bureau and other agencies define Augusta's Metropolitan Statistical Area, the Augusta-Richmond County, GA-SC Metropolitan Statistical Area, as comprising Richmond, Burke, Columbia, Lincoln, McDuffie, Wilkes, Jefferson, Warren, Jenkins and Screven Counties in Georgia and Aiken, Edgefield, McCormick, Barnwell, Bamberg and Allendale Counties in South Carolina. In the official 2010 U.S. Census, the area had a population of 708,122. Its 2019 estimated population was 696,410.

Counties

In Georgia

In South Carolina

Communities

Places with more than 40,000 inhabitants
Augusta-Richmond County (balance), Georgia (Principal city) Pop: 197,872

Places with 10,000 to 40,000 inhabitants
Martinez, Georgia Pop: 35,795
Aiken, South Carolina Pop: 29,884
Evans, Georgia Pop: 29,011
North Augusta, South Carolina Pop: 21,873
Grovetown, Georgia Pop: 14,473

Places with 5,000 to 10,000 inhabitants
Thomson, Georgia Pop: 6,718
Belvedere, South Carolina Pop: 5,792
Waynesboro, Georgia Pop: 5,816

Places with 1,000 to 5,000 inhabitants
Edgefield, South Carolina Pop: 4,690
Barnwell, South Carolina Pop: 4,500
Clearwater, South Carolina Pop: 4,370
Hephzibah, Georgia Pop: 4,021
Gloverville, South Carolina Pop: 2,831
Burnettown, South Carolina Pop: 2,673
Harlem, Georgia Pop: 2,779
Johnston, South Carolina Pop: 2,362
New Ellenton, South Carolina Pop: 2,052
Jackson, South Carolina Pop: 1,700
Lincolnton, Georgia Pop: 1,520

Places with fewer than 1,000 inhabitants
Sardis, Georgia Pop: 999
Wagener, South Carolina Pop: 797
Blythe, Georgia Pop: 721
Dearing, Georgia Pop: 549
Salley, South Carolina Pop: 398
Keysville, Georgia (partial) Pop: 332
Midville, Georgia Pop: 269
Monetta, South Carolina (partial) Pop: 236
Perry, South Carolina Pop: 233
Trenton, South Carolina Pop: 196
Girard, Georgia Pop: 156
Windsor, South Carolina Pop: 121
Vidette, Georgia Pop: 112

Demographics
As of the census of 2000, there were 499,684 people, 184,801 households, and 132,165 families residing within the MSA. The racial makeup of the MSA was 60.81% White, 35.09% African American, 0.32% Native American, 1.42% Asian, 0.08% Pacific Islander, 0.85% from other races, and 1.43% from two or more races. Hispanic or Latino of any race were 2.40% of the population.

The median income for a household in the MSA was $36,933, and the median income for a family was $42,869. Males had a median income of $34,574 versus $22,791 for females. The per capita income for the MSA was $17,652.

See also
Georgia census statistical areas
South Carolina census statistical areas

References

 https://web.archive.org/web/20131013222920/http://2010.census.gov/2010census/popmap/

 
Geography of Richmond County, Georgia
Geography of Aiken County, South Carolina
Geography of Columbia County, Georgia
Geography of Edgefield County, South Carolina
Geography of Burke County, Georgia
Geography of McDuffie County, Georgia
Metropolitan areas of Georgia (U.S. state)
Regions of South Carolina